William Harrison Cook,  (September 2, 1903 – May 19, 1998) was an English Canadian food technologist and biochemist. He was executive director of the National Research Council.

Born in Alnwick, England, Cook immigrated to Canada in 1912. After graduating from the School of Agriculture in Claresholm, Alberta, the University of Alberta and Stanford University with a Ph.D. in chemistry, he starting working for National Research Council's applied biology division focusing on the transport of perishable foods and refrigerated storage. In 1941, he became director of the division and was in charge of research on the preservation and transportation of bacon, poultry and eggs during World War II.

Honours
In 1969, he was made an Officer of the Order of Canada. He was awarded an honorary doctorate degree from the University of Saskatchewan in 1948 in recognition of "his eminent service to agricultural science".

References

External links
 William Harrison Cook at The Canadian Encyclopedia

1903 births
1998 deaths
Canadian biochemists
English emigrants to Canada
Fellows of the Royal Society of Canada
Officers of the Order of Canada
Canadian Officers of the Order of the British Empire
People from Alnwick
Stanford University alumni
University of Alberta alumni